Helgalund, Helgalunden, or Tjurberget, is a  neighbourhood on the island Södermalm in Stockholm, Sweden. The picturesque area was designed by architect and city planner Per Olof Hallman, c. 1930.

The neighbourhood is located on the hill Tjurberget with parks in the north and south.  At the centre of Helgalund is Allhelgonakyrkan, the "Church of all saints," in the grove Helgalunden, from which the area takes its name.  The eight groves of Rosenlundsparken, Tjurbergsgatan, Blekingegatan, Götgatan, Dalslandsgatan, Tjurberget, Assesorsgatan, and Grindsgatan roughly make up the borders of the area.

Voting statistics
Helgalund is divided between the constituency|constituencies of Katarina 9-12 and the inhabitants tend to vote leftist:

In 2002:

 15-20% were for the Left Party in 2002
 25-35% were for the Social Democrats
 7-12% were for the Green Party.

Other groups:
 Conservatives 11-18%
 Liberals 14-20%
 Christian Democrats 3-6%
 Center Party 1-2%
 Others 2-3%

Helgalund is home to the National Academy of Mime and Acting, as well as a bust of actress Greta Garbo.

Geography of Stockholm